David B. Armstrong (born October 3, 1961) is an American far-right politician and local administrator.  A Republican, he represents the 75th district of the Wisconsin State Assembly.  The 75th district comprises Barron County, the southern half of Washburn County, and several neighboring towns in Polk, St. Croix, and Dunn counties in northwestern Wisconsin. He was elected in November 2020.

Early career
Armstrong was active in the substance abuse testing industry, working as a vice president at Healthcomp Evaluation Services Corporation and then ClinNet Solutions.  The latter was acquired by ADP in 2004.  Armstrong's autobiographical website further states that he was the founder of two other health-related companies earlier in his career, both of which were acquired.

Political career
In 2009, Armstrong was elected to the Rice Lake city council, ultimately serving until 2013.  Also in 2009, he joined the board of the Rice Lake Cable Commission, where he served until 2020.  While on the City Council, in 2010, he was appointed to the board of the Barron County Economic Development Corporation and was chosen as executive director of the organization in 2012—a position he still holds.  He also currently serves on the Rice Lake Utilities Commission, since 2015.

In March 2020, incumbent assemblymember Romaine Quinn announced he would not seek a fourth term in the Wisconsin State Assembly.  Within days, Armstrong announced he would be a candidate for the Republican nomination to replace Quinn in the 75th assembly district.  Armstrong did not face an opponent in the Republican primary and went on to face Democrat John C. Ellenson, a former Wisconsin Badgers basketball player, in the November general election.

Armstrong ran into significant controversy in September 2020 when a review of his Twitter feed found that he had been posting and retweeting messages from the QAnon conspiracy theory. When asked about it, Armstrong did not disavow the conspiracy and instead said that he finds the core claims "interesting" but not necessarily credible though this view was misreported.  A further review found what the Democrat Party of Wisconsin described as years of racism, misogyny, religious bigotry, and conspiracy theories in his feed. In the days just after the 2015 Charleston church shooting, he posted a series of supposedly racist tweets, including one featuring a snippet of Ku Klux Klan leader David Duke.  Armstrong was also apparently outraged by subsequent bipartisan vote in Congress to ban the Confederate flag, as he then promised to stop donating to the Republican Party as punishment for their act.  Reacting to the outrage in 2020 over the David Duke video, Armstrong apologized and stated that he didn't know where he found the Public Television video, hadn't watched the full video, and absolutely was not a supporter of the KKK.  The tweets and Facebook posts were compiled by the Democratic Party of Wisconsin in an attack webpage, called The Real Dave Armstrong.  Despite the controversy, Armstrong won the election with 62.33% of the vote—a higher percentage that his predecessor had achieved in the 2018 election.

On Wednesday, June 22, 2022, Governor Evers’ called for a Special Session to defend reproductive rights in Wisconsin to introduce and pass AB 713 and AB 106, which would have protected the right for women to have a say over their bodies. Despite the fact that there is a bipartisan support for legal access to abortion from both Wisconsin Democrats and Republicans, David Armstrong and other Republicans in the Legislature gaveled in and gaveled out at the special session without protecting women's rights and leaving 1.3 million Wisconsin women of reproductive age without rights to their own bodies.

Personal life and family
Dave Armstrong and his wife Janell reside in Rice Lake, Wisconsin.  They have four adult children and several grandchildren.

Armstrong has been involved with many volunteer organizations in Rice Lake and Barron County.  He was president of the Humane Society of Barron County, after serving as co-president from 2009. He was vice president of a local anti-poverty nonprofit organization known as  Community Connections to Prosperity from 2016 to 2019.  He was a board member of Wisconsin Voices for Recovery, a nonprofit for anti-addiction services.  He was President of the Law Enforcement Foundation of Barron County until 2020 and a board member of the Barron County Historical Society until 2021.

Electoral history

Wisconsin Assembly (2020)

| colspan="6" style="text-align:center;background-color: #e9e9e9;"| General Election, November 3, 2020

References

External links
 
 
 Campaign website
 Rice Lake Utilities
 Barron County Economic Development Corporation
 Wisconsin Voices for Recovery
 75th Assembly District map (2011–2021)

Living people
People from Rice Lake, Wisconsin
Wisconsin city council members
Republican Party members of the Wisconsin State Assembly
21st-century American politicians
1961 births